Kęszyca  (formerly German Kainscht) is a village in the administrative district of Gmina Międzyrzecz, within Międzyrzecz County, Lubusz Voivodeship, in western Poland.

The village has a population of 667.

See also
Regenwurmlager

References

Villages in Międzyrzecz County